Korithi is a settlement near the northwestern tip of the island of Zakynthos, Greece. It is located around 9 kilometers northeast of Volimes, 2 kilometers north of Agios Nikolaos and 41 kilometers northwest of Zakynthos City. In 1981, the population of Korithi was around 110 inhabitants. In 1991, the population declined to around 72 inhabitants.

External links
Greek Travel Pages - Korithi

Populated places in Zakynthos